The 2006 Race of Champions took place on 16 December at the Stade de France in Saint-Denis.

The Nations' Cup was competed first and the event was won by Finland, with Heikki Kovalainen winning over United States' Travis Pastrana on the final round. Kovalainen's teammate was the two-time World Rally Champion Marcus Grönholm, whereas Pastrana drove all the rounds for the US team, after both Jimmie Johnson and his replacement, Scott Speed, had to withdraw from competing due to injuries.

The individual event and the Henri Toivonen Memorial Trophy was won by Mattias Ekström of Sweden. He beat Kovalainen by 0.0002 seconds in the semi-finals, and defending champion, Sébastien Loeb of France, in the finals.

The cars used were the Citroën Xsara WRC, the Renault Mégane Trophy, the Porsche 996 GT3 RSR, the Aston Martin V8 Vantage Rally GT and the ubiquitous ROC Buggy.

Participants

Race of Champions

Racing Group

Rallying Group

Final

The Nations Cup

Preliminary Round

Quarterfinals

Semifinals

Final

See also 
 Race of Champions

References

External links 

Results obtained from http://www.jon44w.com/site3/viewthread.php?fid=72&tid=2060&action=printable

2006 in French motorsport
December 2006 sports events in France
2006
International sports competitions hosted by France